Gili Sharir (born 22 November 1999) is an Israeli judoka. She is the 2018 Hohhot Grand Prix silver medallist in the -63 kg weight class.

Early life
Sharir's grew up in moshav Mazor, where her parents Danit and Danny still reside.

Career
Earlier in her career, Sharir won a silver medal at the 2017 European U21 Championships and a bronze at the 2017 European U23 Championships.

Sharir represents Israel at the 2020 Summer Olympics, competing at the women's 63 kg weight category. She lost in the first round to the five time Oceanian Champion, Australian Katharina Haecker, ending her part in the individual competition.

References

External links

 
 
 Gili Sharir at the European Judo Union
 

1999 births
Living people
Israeli female judoka
Judoka at the 2019 European Games
European Games competitors for Israel
Judoka at the 2020 Summer Olympics
Olympic judoka of Israel
Israeli people of Jewish descent
Medalists at the 2020 Summer Olympics
Olympic medalists in judo
Olympic bronze medalists for Israel